Robert Derby (born 7 March 2002) is a Papua New Guinea international rugby league footballer who plays as a er for the North Queensland Cowboys in the NRL.

Background
Derby was born in Port Moresby, Papua New Guinea and lived in Mendi, Goroka, Mount Hagen and Vietnam before moving to Cairns when he was eight years old. 

He played his junior rugby league for Cairns Brothers and attended St Augustine's College before being signed by the Melbourne Storm in 2019.

Playing career
In 2020, Derby joined the Sunshine Coast Falcons, playing just one Mal Meninga Cup game before the season was cancelled due to COVID-19.

In 2021, he returned to Cairns, joining the Northern Pride's under-21 side and the North Queensland Cowboys Young Guns squad.

In 2022, Derby spent the season playing for the Pride's Queensland Cup side, scoring seven tries in 16 games. On 25 June 2022, he made his international debut for Papua New Guinea in their 24-14 victory over Fiji.

On 16 November 2022, Derby joined the Cowboys' NRL squad for the 2023 season.

References

External links
Northern Pride profile

2002 births
Living people
Papua New Guinea national rugby league team players
Papua New Guinean rugby league players
Rugby league wingers
Northern Pride RLFC players